Berlin Township is one of twenty-five townships in Bureau County, Illinois, United States. As of the  census, its population was 659 and it contained 297 housing units.

Geography

Cities
 Dover (east quarter)
 Malden

Unincorporated towns
 Zearing

Cemeteries
The township contains Malden Cemetery.

Major highways
  US Route 34

Demographics 
As of the 2020 census there were 659 people, 289 households, and 200 families residing in the township. The racial makeup of the township was 94.23% White, 1.06% African American, 0.30% Native American, 0.00% Asian, 0.00% Pacific Islander, 1.97% from other races, and 2.43% from two or more races. Hispanic or Latino of any race were 5.01% of the population.

There were 289 households, out of which 33.90% had children under the age of 18 living with them, 53.29% were married couples living together, 10.38% had a female householder with no spouse present, and 30.80% were non-families. 24.90% of all households were made up of individuals, and 12.80% had someone living alone who was 65 years of age or older. The average household size was 2.51 and the average family size was 2.89.

The township's age distribution consisted of 24.4% under the age of 18, 6.7% from 18 to 24, 26.8% from 25 to 44, 25% from 45 to 64, and 16.9% who were 65 years of age or older. The median age was 37.2 years. For every 100 females, there were 96.2 males. For every 100 females age 18 and over, there were 114.5 males.

The median income for a household in the township was $66,806, and the median income for a family was $76,964. Males had a median income of $51,250 versus $18,958 for females. The per capita income for the township was $28,651. About 15.5% of families and 18.0% of the population were below the poverty line, including 37.3% of those under age 18 and 6.5% of those age 65 or over.

School districts
 Malden Community School District
 La Moille Community Unit School District 303

Political districts
 Illinois's 11th congressional district
 State House District 76
 State Senate District 38

References
 
 US Census Bureau 2007 TIGER/Line Shapefiles
 United States National Atlas

External links
 City-Data.com
 Illinois State Archives

Townships in Bureau County, Illinois
Populated places established in 1849
Townships in Illinois
1849 establishments in Illinois